Al-Āghwār al-Janūbī is one of the districts  of Karak governorate, Jordan.

References 

 
Districts of Jordan